Pierre Julien Turgeon (born August 28, 1969) is a Canadian professional ice hockey coach and former player.

Selected first overall by the Buffalo Sabres in the 1987 NHL Entry Draft, Turgeon played in the NHL for the Sabres, New York Islanders, Montreal Canadiens, St. Louis Blues, Dallas Stars and Colorado Avalanche. He is the younger brother of former NHL player Sylvain Turgeon. They are the only two brothers in NHL history to be selected in the No. 1 and 2 slots of the draft (in separate years). He is one of 46 players to have scored 500 goals, but he is one of five eligible players to not be a member of the Hockey Hall of Fame.

Playing career

Early years
Turgeon was a member of Canada's team that was involved in the "Punch-up in Piestany", a bench-clearing brawl between Canada and the Soviet Union during the final game of the 1987 World Junior Ice Hockey Championships in Piešťany, Czechoslovakia (now Slovakia) on January 4, 1987. He was the only Canadian who did not initially leave the bench until Canadian head coach Bert Templeton convinced him to go on the ice. Regarding not leaving the bench, Turgeon stated in 2017: "that wasn't my job. I didn't have to fight." Many of their teammates never forgave Turgeon for failing to defend his teammates. In the words of Everett Sanipass: "I'm looking for someone to help (Stéphane) Roy out and I look over at the bench.  There's this dog Turgeon, just sitting there, with his head down. He wouldn't get his ass off the bench ... just sitting there when everyone's off the Soviet bench and at least one of our guys is in real trouble getting double-teamed."

Buffalo Sabres
Turgeon was drafted by the Buffalo Sabres as the first overall pick in the 1987 NHL Entry Draft. Rick Jeanneret, play-by-play announcer for the Sabres, coined the phrase "Ooh-la-la Pierre" for Turgeon.

Turgeon would quickly make an impact with the Sabres once he arrived. In his rookie season, he contributed a respectable 42 points (14 goals, 28 assists) during the 1987–88 season, helping the Sabres reach the Stanley Cup playoffs for the first time in three years. His production increased to 88 points (34 goals and 54 assists) for the 1988–89 season as he quickly became a fan favourite. In the 1989–90 season, he became a star by scoring 106 points (40 goals and 66 assists) and playing in the 1990 NHL All-Star Game. Turgeon's production dipped a little bit in the 1990–91 season to 79 points (32 goals and 47 assists), but he was still a solid performer.

New York Islanders
On October 25, 1991, after over four years with the Sabres, Turgeon was traded (along with Benoît Hogue, Uwe Krupp and Dave McLlwain) to the New York Islanders in exchange for Pat LaFontaine, Randy Wood, Randy Hillier and future considerations. Turgeon's best season as an Islander was in 1992–93, where he scored 58 goals and 132 points and helped lead the Islanders to the Wales Conference Finals, where they would lose to eventual Stanley Cup champion Montreal Canadiens in five games. En route, the Islanders defeated the Washington Capitals and upset the two-time defending Stanley Cup champions Pittsburgh Penguins.

The first round series, which the Islanders won in six games, is infamous for an on-ice incident. After scoring a goal to put the Islanders up 5-1 during game six at Nassau Coliseum, Turgeon was checked from behind by Dale Hunter of the Capitals as he celebrated his goal. Turgeon suffered a separated shoulder and missed the ensuing series against the Penguins. Hunter received a then-record 21-game suspension for the hit. Turgeon returned for the semifinals against the Montreal Canadiens after missing seven games. The Islanders, who were widely believed to be favorites to go on to the Stanley Cup that year and meet the Los Angeles Kings, bowed out to a less-talented Canadiens team because of his injury.
 The Islanders bowed out of the playoffs after a hard-fought five-game series, two of which went to overtime. After defeating the Islanders, the Canadiens went on to win the Stanley Cup.

As an Islander, Turgeon was awarded the Lady Byng Memorial Trophy in the 1992–93 season.

Montreal Canadiens
Following the 1994–95 NHL lockout in which the 1994–95 season was limited to 48 games, Islanders general manager Don Maloney decided to rebuild the team, which included trading Turgeon and Vladimir Malakhov to the Montreal Canadiens in exchange for Kirk Muller, Mathieu Schneider and Craig Darby at the trading deadline. Turgeon would be named captain of the Canadiens for the 1995–96 season after the departure of Mike Keane to the Colorado Avalanche in December 1995. During the 1995–96 season, Turgeon would nearly record a 100-point season with 38 goals and 58 assists for 96 points; he would also play in the 1996 NHL All-Star Game.

Years in St. Louis
On October 29, 1996, Turgeon was traded to the St. Louis Blues (along with Rory Fitzpatrick and Craig Conroy) in exchange for Murray Baron, Shayne Corson and a fifth-round pick in the 1997 NHL Entry Draft. Turgeon spent the next five seasons producing well with the likes of Brett Hull, Chris Pronger, Al MacInnis and Grant Fuhr as teammates.  He averaged more than 70 points per season and scored several key post-season goals during his tenure in St. Louis.

Dallas Stars/Colorado Avalanche
On July 1, 2001, Turgeon joined the Dallas Stars as a free agent, followed by the Colorado Avalanche as a free agent on August 3, 2005. Turgeon took a year off during the 2004–05 NHL lockout. Upon signing with the Avalanche, Turgeon switched his jersey number to #87 from his customary #77, as the number was retired by Colorado for Ray Bourque.

On November 8, 2005, Turgeon became the 34th player in NHL history to score 500 goals, doing so against the San Jose Sharks.

On September 5, 2007, Turgeon announced his retirement from the NHL. He is the highest-scoring player in NHL history who is otherwise eligible and has not been elected to the Hockey Hall of Fame.

Coaching career
On July 10, 2017, Turgeon was named as the offensive coordinator of the Los Angeles Kings. On June 8, 2018, the Kings announced that they had accepted Turgeon's resignation to leave the organization due to family reasons.

Turgeon, the racehorse
George W. Strawbridge, Jr., an active shareholder of the Buffalo Sabres and director and member of the team's executive committee for more than 30 years, named one of his thoroughbred racehorses in Pierre Turgeon's honor. Turgeon raced for Strawbridge's racing stable in France where he won several conditions races and, after retiring, is developing into a successful sire.

Personal life
Turgeon and his wife Elisabeth have four children and currently live in Cherry Hills Village, Colorado. One of their children, Elizabeth, died in a car accident on December 23, 2010, near Vaughn, New Mexico, at age 18. Turgeon represented Canada in the Little League World Series in 1982. Turgeon's son Dominic was drafted 63rd overall by the Detroit Red Wings in the 2014 NHL Entry Draft. His daughter, Valérie Turgeon, was a forward for Harvard Crimson women's ice hockey team, playing for two seasons.

Awards and honors

Career statistics

Regular season and playoffs

International

See also

 List of NHL statistical leaders
 Notable families in the NHL
 List of NHL players with 1,000 points
 List of NHL players with 500 goals
 List of NHL players with 1,000 games played

References

External links

Profile at Greatest Hockey Legends

1969 births
Living people
Buffalo Sabres draft picks
Buffalo Sabres players
Canadian ice hockey centres
Colorado Avalanche players
Dallas Stars players
French Quebecers
Granby Bisons players
Ice hockey people from Quebec
Lady Byng Memorial Trophy winners
Montreal Canadiens players
National Hockey League All-Stars
National Hockey League first-overall draft picks
National Hockey League first-round draft picks
New York Islanders players
Sportspeople from Rouyn-Noranda
St. Louis Blues players
Los Angeles Kings coaches
People from Arapahoe County, Colorado
Canadian ice hockey coaches